KJMJ (580 AM), also known as Radio Maria USA, is a Catholic American radio station broadcasting from Alexandria, Louisiana. It is the originating station of The World Family of Radio Maria's US operations, airing Catholic programming including a mix of traditional Catholic worship and contemporary Christian music, along with a weekday Mass, frequent recitals of the Holy Rosary and various talk and teaching programs on the Catholic faith.

It is simulcast on nine full powered stations and one low powered translator, and its audio stream can be accessed from its website and via apps for iPhone, BlackBerry, Windows and Android mobile phone devices.

Radio Maria USA also streams from the Tune In app for smartphones and Amazon's Fire tablets in addition to the portable Alexa device by speaking the verbal command "Alexa..Open Radio Maria."

History
The station began broadcasting September 21, 1935 holding the call sign KALB. It was owned by the Alexandria Broadcasting Company, and originally broadcast at 1420 kHz, running 100 watts during daytime hours only. In 1937, the station's frequency was changed to 1210 kHz, and it began nighttime operations, running 250 watts during the day and 100 watts at night. In 1939, it began running 250 watts 24 hours a day. KALB's frequency was changed to 1240 kHz in March 1941, as a result of the North American Regional Broadcasting Agreement. In 1945, its frequency was changed to 580 kHz, and it ran 1,000 watts 24 hours a day. Its daytime power was increased to 5,000 watts in 1947.

In 1948, its FM sister KALB-FM 96.9 MHz (now KZMZ) began broadcasting, and simulcast the programming of KALB 580. It was later the radio sister of KALB-TV channel 5. It was an affiliate of ABC Radio in the 1940s, 1950s, and early 1960s. In 1962, it ended its affiliation with ABC and became a CBS affiliate. Over the years, KALB aired a variety of country music and contemporary hits programs. In the 1970s, the station aired a MOR format and in the 1980s it aired a country format. KALB aired an oldies format in the 1990s. In 1994, KALB was sold to Stellar Communications, along with 96.9 KZMZ, for $815,000.

In January 1995, the station was sold to Faith Broadcasting for $125,000. On January 17, 1995, its call sign was changed to KLBG, and it adopted a soul gospel format. The station was branded "Faith 580".

In late 1999, the station was sold Radio Maria Inc., along with AM 1250 KALO in Port Arthur, Texas, for $900,000. In January 2000, its call sign was changed to KJMJ and it was taken off the air while its facilities were being upgraded. Its initial broadcast as KJMJ commenced on May 25, 2000. It was the first English-language Radio Maria station in the United States. Afterward, a network of repeaters were established. Father Duane Stenzel O.F.M. served as its first national program director, Mass celebrant, teacher and on-air personality from its 2000 inception until his death on January 18, 2011.

Radio Maria began broadcasting from its first English-speaking station in the US since May 25, 2000, in Alexandria, Louisiana. It has expanded to include 11 frequencies in six other states, including Texas, Mississippi, Ohio, Wisconsin, Pennsylvania and Florida.

Repeaters
Radio Maria USA's programming can also be heard on these stations:

AM

FM

Former repeater

References

External links
 Radio Maria USA in English-language (with streaming audio)
 Radio Maria USA in Spanish-language (with streaming audio)
 Radio Maria USA in Italian-language (with streaming audio)

Christian radio stations in Louisiana
Catholic radio stations
Radio stations established in 1935
1935 establishments in Louisiana
Mass media in Alexandria, Louisiana